Faye McKeever (born 18 January 1985) is an English actress. Her notable works include playing Linda in Sky 1 sitcom Trollied, Marie in Massive and Claire Olssen in Little Boy Blue.

Early life
McKeever was born on 18 January 1985 in Manchester, United Kingdom.

Career 
McKeever first rose to prominence in 2006 playing Donna Marie in the spin-off series Hollyoaks: In The City. This was McKeever's first major television role. In 2008, she landed a role as Lou in Torn Up Tales which first aired on 2 June 2008 on BBC Three. Later on in 2008, McKeever played the role, Marie, in Massive on BBC Three again in September and October. Whilst on the set, she was acting with Carl Rice, Lorraine Cheshire and Beverly Rudd, all actors on the cast of Trollied. In 2009, she appeared on ITV's Unforgiven as Hannah Whelan. She then featured in the 6th episode of Season 3 of The Street, playing Hannah. She played Susan in the 8th episode of the 7th season of Shameless. McKeever's first appearance in 2011 came on Sky 1's Mount Pleasant as a checkout girl. Her second TV appearance came on Trollied as Linda in August 2011, which she portrayed until the show's end in 2018. In February 2017, she appeared in the two-part drama series, The Moorside based on the Kidnapping of Shannon Matthews and in April 2017 she appeared in Little Boy Blue, a show based on the murder of Rhys Jones.

Filmography

Personal life 
She had been in a relationship with X Factor winner and British singer Shayne Ward since 2003 and was engaged to him on their 9th anniversary in September 2012. He proposed to McKeever whilst having dinner at the restaurant at the OXO Tower in London, United Kingdom. In January 2014, the couple decided to split, not stating any reasons.

References

External links

1985 births
21st-century English actresses
Actresses from Manchester
English television actresses
Living people